Cantabria may refer to:
Cantabria, a Spanish historical region and autonomous community
 Former territory of Cantabri people
Duchy of Cantabria, a march created by the Visigoths in northern Iberian Peninsula between the 7th and 9th centuries
Present-day Basque Autonomous Community, or sometimes the whole Basque region, during the Modern Age
Cantabria (Spanish Congress Electoral District)
SS Cantabria (1919), a Spanish cargo ship sunk in the Spanish Civil War
, a Spanish replenishment vessel commissioned in 2010
Cantabria (Madrid Metro)

See also
Cantabrian (disambiguation)
Cantabrigian